This article covers the details of the Preparations for Hurricane Katrina, a major category 5 hurricane that devastated parts of New Orleans, Florida, Louisiana, Mississippi, and Alabama, as well as the Hurricane Pam simulation and NWS forecasts that led to the U.S. government's decision to establish a Bipartisan Congressional Committee to investigate the country's preparedness for and response to Hurricane Katrina.

Preparations by location

South Florida
Many people living in the South Florida area were unaware when Katrina strengthened from a tropical storm to a hurricane in one day and struck southern Florida on August 25, 2005, near the Miami-Dade – Broward county line. However, National Hurricane Center (NHC) forecasts had correctly predicted the strengthening, and hurricane watches and warnings were properly issued nearly 6–8 days, respectively, before hurricane conditions were felt in the area.

Florida Governor Jeb Bush declared a state of emergency on August 24 in advance of Hurricane Katrina's landfall in Florida. Shelters were opened and schools closed in several counties in the southern part of the state. A number of evacuation orders were also issued, mostly voluntary, although a mandatory evacuation was ordered for vulnerable housing in Martin County.

Gulf Coast
On August 27, after Hurricane Katrina crossed southern Florida and strengthened to a Category 3  storm, President George W. Bush declared a state of emergency in Louisiana, Alabama, and Mississippi two days before the hurricane made landfall.

On August 28, the National Weather Service in Slidell, Louisiana issued a bulletin predicting "devastating" damage rivaling the intensity of Hurricane Camille. Mandatory evacuations were issued for large areas of southeast Louisiana as well as coastal Mississippi and Alabama.

On Sunday, August 28, Canadian National Railway (CN) suspended all rail traffic on its lines south of McComb, Mississippi (lines owned by its subsidiary Illinois Central Railroad that extend into New Orleans), in anticipation of damage from the hurricane. To help ease the resumption of services after the storm passes, CN also issued an embargo with the Association of American Railroads against all deliveries to points south of Osyka, Mississippi. CSX Transportation also suspended service south of Montgomery, Alabama until further notice.

Amtrak, America's rail passenger carrier, announced that the southbound City of New Orleans passenger trains from Chicago, from August 29 through September 3, would terminate in Memphis, Tennessee, rather than their usual destination of New Orleans. The corresponding northbound trains would also originate in Memphis. The southbound Crescent from New York City, for the same period, terminated in Atlanta, with the corresponding northbound trains originating in Atlanta as well. Amtrak's westbound Sunset Limited originated in San Antonio, Texas, rather than its normal origin point of Orlando, Florida. Amtrak announced that no alternate transportation options would be made available into or out of the affected area.

The Waterford nuclear power plant was also shut down on Sunday, August 28, in anticipation of Katrina's arrival.

New Orleans

By August 26, the possibility of unprecedented cataclysm was already being considered. Some computer models were putting the city of New Orleans right in the center of their track probabilities, and the chances of a direct hit were forecast at 17% (with strike probability rising to 29% by August 28). This scenario was considered a potential catastrophe because 80% of the New Orleans metropolitan area is below sea level along Lake Pontchartrain. Since the storm surge produced by the hurricane's right-front quadrant (containing the strongest winds) was more than 20 ft (6 m) near Biloxi, emergency management officials in New Orleans feared that the storm surge could go over the tops of levees protecting the city, causing major flooding. This risk of devastation had been known for some time; previous studies by FEMA and the Army Corps of Engineers had warned that a direct hurricane strike on New Orleans could lead to massive flooding, which would lead to thousands of drowning deaths, as well as many more suffering from disease and dehydration, as the flood waters slowly receded from the city.

At a news conference 10:00 AM on August 28, shortly after Katrina was upgraded to a Category 5  storm, New Orleans mayor Ray Nagin ordered the first ever mandatory evacuation of the city, calling Katrina, "a storm that most of us have long feared" and also saying it was "a once-in-a-lifetime event". To speed up the evacuations, authorities used contraflow lane reversal on Interstate 10 leading west of New Orleans, as well as on Interstate 55 and 59 leading north from the city. The city government also established a "refuge of last resort" for citizens who could not leave the city, at the massive Louisiana Superdome, which housed approximately 26,000 people with food and water for two days as the storm came ashore. The Louisiana National Guard delivered three truckloads of water and seven truckloads of MRE's to the Superdome, "enough to supply 15,000 people for three days" said Colonel Jay Mayeaux, director of the Department of Homeland Security's office for emergency preparedness.

Louisiana's hurricane evacuation plan calls for local governments in areas along and near the coast to call for evacuations in three phases, starting with the immediate coast 50 hours before the start of tropical storm force winds. Persons in areas designated Phase II begin evacuating 40 hours before the onset of tropical storm winds and those in Phase III areas (including New Orleans) evacuate 30 hours before the start of such winds.

However, many parishes were not able to provide sufficient transportation for citizens who did not have private means of evacuation, and many private care-taking facilities who relied on the same bus companies and ambulance services for evacuation were unable to evacuate their charges. Fuel and rental cars were in short supply and many forms of public transportation had been shut down well before the storm arrived.  The result was that hundreds of thousands of residents and tourists were unable to evacuate and remained in the city. Nonetheless, some estimates claimed that 90-92% of the 1.3 million residents of the New Orleans metropolitan region evacuated including 80% of Orleans parish. More than 80,000 people were homeless at the time.

Hurricane Pam simulation 
Months before Hurricane Katrina made landfall on New Orleans, a hurricane simulation was created to warn the city of a potential hurricane crisis and its devastating outcomes. The simulation was named Pam, in which a category 3 hurricane's strong winds and flooding caused the levee system of New Orleans to fail and leave the city underwater. Many emergency officials were stunned by the lack of response to Hurricane Pam's simulation, expressing their concerns that if a disaster like this did occur, the effects would be catastrophic.

It was indeed confirmed that Pam's disaster plan was seen by FEMA and Louisiana state officials, to no avail. Under Hurricane Pam's disaster plan, it was decided that preparations for the hurricane should have been happening for three days prior to the hurricane's arrival on land. In New Orleans, a mandatory evacuation was not ordered by the city until approximately 20 hours before Hurricane Katrina made landfall. On top of this, it was important that officials representing FEMA had critical resources ready to go before the storm hit the city, which they failed to do so. While it is true that the authorities of the city and state government were mainly in charge of moving people to safety, Hurricane Pam's disaster plan noted that there was a scarcity of resources in support shelters for the state of Louisiana.

Shortly thereafter the effects of Hurricane Katrina were evident, President Bush made it clear that he wanted there to be an investigation regarding the government's preparedness for and response to Hurricane Katrina.

National Weather Center Forecast and Warning Services 
The National Weather Center's (NWS) services are provided collaboratively with several different offices that specialize in certain areas regarding the weather. Some of these offices include the National Hurricane Center (NHC) and the Hydro-meteorological Prediction Center (HPC). The NHC is a component for the National Centers for Environmental Prediction, and the HPC is a provider of weather forecasts and analyses that support the NWS.

Along with this, the HPC supplies the NHC with precipitation statements. After what is considered a tropical storm progresses inward on land and the NHS terminates any alerts they put out, the HPC then accepts the authority of watching over the system. The two offices work hand in hand with one another to ensure the most accurate information is released to the public.

The storm that became Hurricane Katrina was recognized by both the NHC and HPC on August 22. After waiting a few days to monitor development, the HPC started formulating precipitation statements for Hurricane Katrina on August 24. on August 30, the HPC accepted responsibility for the release of warnings regarding Katrina. On August 31, the hurricane system was consumed by a system near the Great Lakes of the east, so the HPC terminated their advisories for Katrina.

The NHC and HPC are essential to one another, especially in that the HPC routinely executes service backup for the NHC. An example of this is when the HPC conducted a respective amount of drills for service backup in the summer months leading up to Katrina. During Hurricane Katrina's landfall, the NHC's implementation and execution of policies was seen as excellent by many government emergency officials. Throughout the tracking of Hurricane Katrina, the NHC's forecasts were very consistent and provided strong evidence for the intensity and power of the storm. Not only were the forecasts made by the NHC accurate, but they were also timely, which allowed for workforce management operation members to in turn provide accurate information to their counterparts. As well as the accuracy and timeliness of the NHC's forecast, it was precisely expected that Hurricane Katrina would be a massive hurricane that caused detrimental effects to the northern Gulf coast.

What seemed shocking to many after Hurricane Katrina had passed was the government failing to do much about the forecasts released by the NHC. It seemed clear to many what the potential effects of Katrina could amount to, yet the storm was not treated how it should have been.

Congressional Committee Establishment 
On September 15, 2005, it was announced that a Bipartisan Congressional Committee had been established to investigate the United States government's preparations for and responses to Hurricane Katrina. This decision was preceded by many different positions of members of the House of Representatives, which are outlined below.

Arguments for the Establishment of a Congressional Committee 
Honorable David Dreier was elected to the U.S. House of Representatives in 1980. He was a Republican Representative from California, and served as the House Rules Committee's Chairman. The following information is regarding the House of Representatives' debate and more specifically, Honorable Dreier's viewpoint on whether to establish a Bipartisan Congressional Committee to investigate the U.S. government's preparations for Hurricane Katrina.

Honorable Dreier agreed with President Bush when he claimed that there were many undesirable characteristics of the government's initial response to Hurricane Katrina. In his debate to the House of Representatives, Honorable Dreier expressed that the Federal Emergency Management System's (FEMA) department head had resigned after the events of Hurricane Katrina. He stated that from what happened during the disaster, there were certainly lessons to be taken away. He called for action from his fellow representatives that there must be an acceptance of the Executive Branch's powers to investigate what went wrong in the response to Hurricane Katrina. In his strong declaration to the House of Representatives, Honorable Dreier made it very clear that a Bipartisan Congressional Committee was necessary in order to follow the nation's precedents and traditions.

As well as this, many delegates viewed an independent commission to be a ridiculous idea and redundant of sorts. They believe that Americans wanted immediate solutions to the hurdles they were being faced with as a result of the lack of preparation for Hurricane Katrina.

Arguments Against the Establishment of a Congressional Committee 
In 1993, Honorable Bennie Thompson was elected to the United States House of Representatives. He was a Democratic Representative from Mississippi, and served as the Mayor of Bolton from the years 1973 to 1979. He also serves as the Homeland Security Committee's Ranking Minority Member. Below is information regarding Honorable Thompson's viewpoint on whether to establish a Bipartisan Congressional Committee during the debate of the U.S. House of Representatives.

Honorable Thompson's opposition began with his perspective that it is not necessary for a Congressional Committee to be entrusted with the investigation. He compared Congress being permitted to investigate the government's preparedness to a fox guarding a hen house, in which he stated that the government is not safeguarding what needs to be safeguarded. He strongly believed that instead of establishing a Congressional Committee, there should be an independent assessment of where the government went wrong. As the Ranking Minority Member of the Homeland Security Committee, he submitted a document outlining the complexity of the problems regarding what happened during Hurricane Katrina and the need for an independent assessment.

As well as Honorable Bennie Thompson, many other delegates of the U.S. House of Representatives were not shy in sharing their viewpoints as to why there should not have been a Congressional Committee Established. They gave their perspectives on a variety of issues why a Congressional Committee was an inadequate idea. Many members of the Democratic party were not keen about establishing this Congressional Committee, as it would have been composed of mainly Republican delegates. The Democrats involved in voicing their opinions did not want the power to be only in the hands of the Republicans, and therefore, voted in opposition of the establishment.

References

 
Karina Preparations